A castro is a fortified settlement, usually pre-Roman, associated with the Celtic culture. These are frequently found in Portugal, usually in the North, but can also be found elsewhere. The word castro comes from the Latin castrum, which means "hill fort".

Northwestern Castro Network 

The Northwestern Castro Network (Rede de Castros do Noroeste), was established in 2015 grouping the most important sites in Northern Portugal as founding members out of 2,000 archaeological sites:

 Boticas (Castro do Lesenho);
 Esposende (São Lourenço);
 Monção (São Caetano);
 Paços de Ferreira (Sanfins);
 Penafiel (Monte Mozinho);
 Póvoa de Varzim (Cividade de Terroso);
 Santo Tirso (Castro do Padrão);
 Trofa (Alvarelhos);
 Vila do Conde (Bagunte);
 the Sociedade Martins Sarmento, from Guimarães (which manages Citânia de Briteiros);
 the Direcção Regional de Cultura, managing Citânia de Santa Lúzia in Viana do Castelo.

Despite its name, the network includes, for the time being, only Portuguese partners, and froze the idea to world heritage candidacy to UNESCO, given the disparities in archaeological research, and the necessity to create visitation and promotion conditions. This is especially true in the municipality of Vila do Conde, which holds Cividade de Bagunte, one of the largest sites, along with seven other castros. The Vila do Conde city hall managed to obtain its Cividade's land area only in 2015, after 60 years of negotiations and legal confrontation.

Map of National Monument Castros in Portugal

Lists of Castros in Portugal

See also 

 History of Portugal
 Prehistoric Iberia
 Castros in Spain

References 

Archaeology of Portugal
Castro culture
Castros in Portugal
Fortifications in Portugal
Bronze Age Portugal
Iron Age Portugal
Portugal history-related lists
Lists of buildings and structures in Portugal